The Topoiyo language is an Austronesian language of West Sulawesi, Indonesia spoken by people in Tabolang Village, Topoyo subdistrict, Central Mamuju Regency, West Sulawesi. Usually, Topoiyo speakers also speak Mamuju and Indonesian. Topoiyo is also spoken in other villages in Topoyo subdistrict, such as Salulebo, Topoyo, and Salupangkang villages.

References 

Kaili–Pamona languages
Languages of Sulawesi